Bootlegging in corporate research and development is defined as "a non-formalised and non-declared (secret) bottom-up innovation process for the benefit of the bootlegger's firm." In corporate bootlegging, an employee works on a project or projects unconnected to their "official" work, and is generally allowed to do so in the understanding that it may benefit the company in some way; however, managerial approval is not always given. David A. Schon introduced the notion of bootlegging into economics and business administration literature in 1963. 

Bootlegging, as it is illegitimate behaviour, may cause an ethical dilemma between moral imperatives (i.e. the anomie caused from management's action plan versus the task to innovate). However, sometimes bootlegging can be carried out in a conspiration with management (conspirational bootlegging). Bootlegging which continues despite explicit managerial disapproval is called "hardcore bootlegging" or "creative deviance".

Causes

The main reason for the occurrence of bootlegging in corporations is the perceived lack of 'free space' for creativity in an employee's role. In particular, a business that emphasises elements of rigid planning – such as an enforced business hierarchy, an emphasis on project proposals, decisions only being taken after cautious initial findings – may clash with an employee's desire for experimental trial and error research.

Bootlegging, as a kind of self-regulating element, bridges the mechanistic world of organization with the chaotic world of creativity and innovation. The theory of path dependency explains why bootleg innovations are (most often) in line with the strategic objectives of the firm: corporate competencies define the search paths for its future. In this respect, the learning processes that are part of bootlegging, beside the tangible output of bootlegging, are beneficial for the firm.

Bootlegging should not be confused with skunk works: skunk work is defined as a sort of elite, working officially on a given project alongside the formal organization to solve problems more efficiently. In fact the Pacific tech's Graphing Calculator project, NuCalc, at Apple Computer was not a skunk works project but a bootleg project.

Permitted bootlegging
Permitted bootlegging is research time where technical staff are allowed to spend a certain amount of their time working on 'pet-projects' in the hope that some day there is some return for the company. Famous examples of companies that follow such an initiative are 3M and Hewlett-Packard. They allow 10 to 15 percent of the working time for own product related interests. 

A well-known example of a permitted bootleg product is the yellow sticky Post-it note developed by Arthur Fry and Spencer Silver at 
3M.

Another famous example is Google, where employees are allowed to spend up to 20% of their work time in personal projects related to the company's business. Several services provided by Google such as Gmail, Google News, Orkut and AdSense were originally created by employees in their work time.

In other languages

The specific phrase used to describe bootlegging varies by language. Quite a few firms have their own specific terms for it.

 English: Friday afternoon work, work behind the fume cupboard, freelance work, under-counter work, under-table work, pet project, discretionary research, free-wheeling, illicit research, scrounging, renegade work, work in the shadow/underworld, unsanctioned innovation, unsponsored innovation, un-solicited innovation, autonomous initiatives, self-organized innovation, stealth innovation.

See also
 Skunkworks project

Notes

References
Schon, D.A., 1963, Champion for Radical New Inventions, in Harvard Business Review, March/April.
Augsdorfer, P., 1996, Forbidden Fruit: an analysis of bootlegging, uncertainty, and learning in corporate R&D, Aldershot
Michalik, C., 2003, Innovative Engagement: An Empirical Study of the Bootlegging Phenomenon in R&D (in German), Gabler
Masoudnia, Y., (2012), Bootlegging in High Technology R&D Departments: From Initiation to Disclosure. Dissertation at Cranfiled University
Stephan, A., (2019), Le bootlegging dans une organisation fondée sur la technologie : défis et opportunités, Dissertation at Strasbourg University
Eicher, St., (2029), Uncovering Covert Innovation: Bootlegging, Illegitimacy, and Management's attitude; Springer Gabler

Informal economy
Research and development